Emmanuel Arriaga Pérez (born February 1, 1991, in Taxco de Alarcón, Guerrero) is a Mexican professional footballer who currently plays for Potros UAEM.

References

1991 births
Living people
Mexican footballers
Association football midfielders
Potros UAEM footballers
Ascenso MX players
Liga Premier de México players
Tercera División de México players
People from Taxco
Footballers from Guerrero